Hachimiya Ahamada (born 1976) is a French film director of Comorian descent, known for her films about the Comoran diaspora.

Life
Hachimiya Ahamada was born in Dunkirk in 1976, to Comorian parents. She made short documentaries as a teenager at a Dunkirk video studio, and later studied film direction at INSAS in Brussels, graduating in 2004. Her short drama The Ylang Ylang Residence (2008) was shot in the Comoros Islands, and in the Comorian language. The film was screened at over 35 international festivals, including the International Critics Week at the 2008 Cannes Film Festival. It won awards at the 2009 Quintessenve International Film Festival of Ouidah, the 2009 Francophone Festival of Vaulx-en-Velin, and the 2009 African, Asian and Latin American Film Festival of Milan.

Ahamada is working on a feature film project, Maïssane or the Canticle of the Stars.

Filmography
 Feu leur rêve [The Dream of Fire], 2004. Documentary short.
 La Résidence Ylang Ylang [The Ylang Ylang Residence], 2008. Short.
 L'Ivresse d'une Oasis [Ashes of Dreams], 2011. Documentary.

References

External links
 

Living people
French film directors
Comorian film directors
French women film directors
French people of Comorian descent
1976 births